Douglas Reichley (born 1961) is a politician from the U.S. state of Pennsylvania; he was elected to the Pennsylvania House of Representatives in 2002, representing the 134th district. He sat on the House Appropriations, Consumer Affairs, Health and Human Services and Professional Licensure Committees and was also a member of the House Republican Policy Committee. In 2011, he was elected Judge on the Lehigh County Court of Common Pleas.

Career
Prior to his tenure as a state legislator, Reichley worked in private practice with Lightner Law Offices in Wescosville.  He was previously an assistant district attorney in the Philadelphia District Attorney's Office.  He also worked as an assistant district attorney in Lehigh County for 11 years, from 1989 to 2000.  He began his law career as an associate with the law firm of Snyder, Dimmich and Guldin in Allentown.

Personal
Reichley holds a Juris Doctor from Dickinson Law School and Bachelor of Arts Degree in Government and Law from Lafayette College.

Reichley has served many posts in his community as president of the Allentown YMCA/YWCA, the Emmaus Kiwanis and on the board of the Lehigh Valley Crime Victims’ Council.  He has also been an instructor at the Allentown Police Academy, Northampton County Community College, and DeSales University and even taught fellow prosecutors at meetings of the Pennsylvania District Attorneys’ Association and the Pennsylvania Bar Institute.

References

External links
Pennsylvania House Republican Caucus Pennsylvania House Republican Caucus site

1961 births
Living people
21st-century American politicians
Dickinson School of Law alumni
Judges of the Pennsylvania Courts of Common Pleas
Lafayette College alumni
Republican Party members of the Pennsylvania House of Representatives
Pennsylvania lawyers